Clavibacter is a genus of aerobic Gram-positive bacteria.

References 

Microbacteriaceae
Bacteria genera